Wikipedia Zero was a project by the Wikimedia Foundation to provide access to Wikipedia free of charge on mobile phones via zero-rating, particularly in developing markets. The objective of the program was to facilitate access to free knowledge for low-income pupils and students, by means of waiving the network traffic cost. With 97 operators in over 72 countries, it was estimated that access to Wikipedia was provided to more than 800 million people through the program. The program ended in 2018.

The program was launched in 2012, and won the 2013 South by Southwest Interactive Award for activism. It received criticism over the years for violating the principle of net neutrality. In February 2018, the project announced the end of the initiative, stating that it would take a new strategy on partnerships.  Despite providing service to 900 million persons, the project was seen as jeopardized by a lack of growth, and by the declining price of cell phone data.

Facebook Zero has been cited as an inspiration for Wikipedia Zero.

History

The map alongside shows the broad scale of launches.

In addition to that, Wikimedia Foundation: mobile network partners has a complete list of participating mobile networks and launch dates.
 Malaysia, on 12 May 2012 (Digi Telecommunications)
 Kenya, on 26 July 2012 (Orange S.A.)
 October 2012: Thailand, in October 2012 (dtac; Saudi Arabia with Saudi Telecom Company
 May 2013: Pakistan, with Mobilink
 June 2013: Sri Lanka, with Dialog Axiata
 October 2013: Jordan, with Umniah; Bangladesh, with Banglalink
 April 2014: Kosovo, on the IPKO network
 May 2014: Nepal, with Ncell and in Kyrgyzstan with Beeline
 May 2014: Nigeria, with Airtel Nigeria
 October 2014: Ukraine, with Kyivstar
 December 2014: Ghana, with MTN Ghana
 December 2014: Angola, with Unitel S.A.
 Algeria, in January 2015 ( Djezzy)
 Moldova, in July 2015 (Moldcell)
 March 2017: Iraq with Asiacell
 September 2017: Afghanistan with Roshan

In February 2018, the Wikimedia Foundation announced that the Wikipedia Zero program would be completely phased out by the end of 2018.

Reception and impact

The Subsecretaria de Telecomunicaciones of Chile ruled that zero-rating services like Wikipedia Zero, Facebook Zero, and Google Free Zone, that subsidize mobile data usage, violate net neutrality laws and had to end the practice by 1 June 2014. The Electronic Frontier Foundation has said, "Whilst we appreciate the intent behind efforts such as Wikipedia Zero, ultimately zero rated services are a dangerous compromise." Accessnow.org has been more critical, saying, "Wikimedia has always been a champion for open access to information, but it's crucial to call out zero-rating programs for what they are: Myopic deals that do great damage to the future of the open internet".

The Wikimedia Foundation's Gayle Karen Young defended the program to The Washington Post, saying, "We have a complicated relationship to net neutrality. We believe in net neutrality in America", while adding that Wikipedia Zero required a different perspective in other countries: "Partnering with telecom companies in the near term, it blurs the net neutrality line in those areas. It fulfills our overall mission, though, which is providing free knowledge".

Journalist Hilary Heuler argued that "for many, zero-rated programs would limit online access to the 'walled gardens' offered by the web heavyweights. For millions of users, Facebook and Wikipedia would end up being synonymous with 'internet'." In 2015, researchers evaluating how the similar program Facebook Zero shapes information and communications technology use in the developing world found that 11% of Indonesians who said they used Facebook also said they did not use the Internet. 65% of Nigerians and 61% of Indonesians agree with the statement that "Facebook is the Internet" compared with only 5% in the United States.

An article in Vice magazine notes that the free access via Wikipedia Zero made Wikimedia Commons a preferred way for its users in Bangladesh and elsewhere to share copyrighted material illicitly. This caused problems at Wikimedia Commons (where uploading media that is not free-licensed is forbidden). The Vice article is critical of the situation created by Wikipedia Zero and of the backlash among Wikimedia Commons editors, arguing: "Because they can't afford access to YouTube and the rest of the internet, Wikipedia has become the internet for lots of Bangladeshis. What's crazy, then, is that a bunch of more-or-less random editors who happen to want to be the piracy police are dictating the means of access for an entire population of people."

See also
 Alliance for Affordable Internet
 Google Free Zone
 Internet.org
 Facebook for SIM
 Airtel Zero

References

External links

 Wikipedia Zero at the Wikimedia Foundation
 Wikimedia blog posts about Wikipedia Zero

Articles containing video clips
Computer-related introductions in 2012
Internet access
Net neutrality
Projects disestablished in 2018
Projects established in 2012
Wikimedia Foundation
Zero